Munissi's shrew (Crocidura munissii) is a species of mammal in the family Soricidae. It is endemic to Tanzania.

It is known only from Rubeho, Udzungwa, Ukaguru and Uluguru mountains. It inhabits montane forests. It has a snout-to-vent length of 75–106 mm, a tail of 66–95 mm and a weight of 9.5–19.5 g, with dark brown fur. This species was named after Tanzanian mammalogist Maiko J. Munissi, in honor of his study of montane mammals of Tanzania.

References 
Crocidura
Endemic fauna of Tanzania
Mammals of Tanzania
Mammals described in 2015